Julia Patricia Bingham (born May 25, 1998) is an American professional soccer player who plays as a defender for National Women's Soccer League (NWSL) club Chicago Red Stars.

Club career

Chicago Red Stars
Bingham made her NWSL debut in the 2020 NWSL Challenge Cup on July 1, 2020.

References

External links
 USC profile

1998 births
Living people
American women's soccer players
Soccer players from California
People from Ontario, California
Women's association football defenders
USC Trojans women's soccer players
Chicago Red Stars draft picks
Chicago Red Stars players
National Women's Soccer League players